The Nikon 1 V1 is a Nikon 1 series high-speed mirrorless interchangeable-lens camera launched by Nikon on 21 September 2011.

The successor is the Nikon 1 V2 announced on October 24, 2012.

The CMOS sensor from Aptina is used, it has 10.1 MP, CX format, die size 16.9x17.9 mm which it is relatively similar with 1" sensor size.

See also
 Nikon 1 series
 Nikon 1-mount

References

External links

 Nikon V1 on Nikon USA site

Nikon MILC cameras
V1